Komaswa is a ward in Tarime District, Mara Region of northern Tanzania, East Africa. In 2016 the Tanzania National Bureau of Statistics report there were 7,570 people in the ward, from 6,860 in 2012.

Villages / neighborhoods 
The ward has 3 villages and 14 hamlets.

 Sombanyasoko
 Kebosere
 Majimaji
 Nyangoge
 Senta
 Nyamirambaro
 Kwikoma
 Nyabukano
 Nyamemange
 Nyametembe
 Surubu
 Gabocha
 Kong'eng'i
 Mtukura
 Nyantare
 Surubu Senta

References

Tarime District
Mara Region